Megachile tricolor is a species of bee in the family Megachilidae. It was described by Pasteels in 1970. The name is a junior homonym of Megachile tricolor Friese, published in 1903.

References

tricolor
Insects described in 1970